Alberta Provincial Highway No. 16, commonly referred to as Highway 16, is a major east–west highway in central Alberta, Canada, connecting Jasper to Lloydminster via Edmonton. It forms a portion of the Yellowhead Highway, a major interprovincial route of the Trans-Canada Highway system that stretches from Masset, British Columbia, to Portage la Prairie, Manitoba, near Winnipeg. It is designated a core route in Canada's National Highway System.

Route description

Jasper National Park 
British Columbia Highway 16 becomes Alberta Highway 16 as it crosses the Continental Divide and Yellowhead Pass into Alberta, entering Jasper National Park. It travels in an easterly direction through the Municipality of Jasper until it reaches the intersection with Highway 93 (Icefields Parkway) and the west access to the Jasper townsite. East of Highway 93, the highway turns to the north, passes the east access to the Jasper townsite, and continues in a northeast direction along the Athabasca River through Improvement District No. 12. The segment of Highway 16 through Jasper National Park is maintained by the Government of Canada.

Jasper National Park to Edmonton 

Upon exiting Jasper National Park, Highway 16 travels through the rural municipalities of Yellowhead County and Parkland County and is maintained by Alberta Transportation until it reaches Edmonton. The highway is a two-lane, undivided highway for  where it becomes a four-lane, divided highway. The highway continues northeast through the Town of Hinton until it reaches the locality of Obed, where it continues east and crosses Obed Summit, the highest point on Yellowhead Highway. The highway passes through the Town of Edson, where the highway splits into parallel one-streets, with eastbound traffic following 2 Avenue and westbound traffic following 4 Avenue. It continues east where it passes by the Hamlets of Niton Junction, Wildwood, Evansburg and Entwistle; through the Hamlet of Gainford and north of Wabamun Lake where it passes by the Summer Village of Seba Beach, Hamlet of Fallis, Hamlet of Wabamun, and Hamlet of Kapasiwin before intersecting Highway 43. The highway intersects Highway 16A (Parkland Highway), which prior to 1997 was part of Highway 16, and passes through the Town of Stony Plain, City of Spruce Grove, and serves as an alternate route into Edmonton.  The present alignment bypasses Stony Plain and serves as the northern boundary of Spruce Grove.  Highway 16 is part of the CANAMEX Corridor between Highway 43 and its western intersection with Anthony Henday Drive.

Edmonton 

Highway 16 passes through Edmonton as a major expressway called Yellowhead Trail, maintained by the City of Edmonton.  Most sections of Yellowhead Trail are free-flowing, while a few intersections still exist from 149 Street to 66 Street. The city closed access to Yellowhead Trail from 89 Street in 2019, marking the first milestone of the Freeway Conversion Program.

Edmonton to Lloydminster 

Highway 16 exits Edmonton and enters Strathcona County just west of its eastern intersection with Anthony Henday Drive (Highway 216).  The highway travels east and serves as the division between Edmonton and the Urban Service Area of Sherwood Park.  The highway continues east past the Hamlet of Ardrossan, through Elk Island National Park, and past the Ukrainian Cultural Heritage Village. The highway then passes through the rural municipalities of Lamont County, County of Minburn, and the County of Vermilion River.  The highway continues in a general southeast direction by Town of Mundare and the Town of Vegreville, where Highway 16A passes directly through the Vegreville. The highway continues by Hamlet of Lavoy, Hamlet of Ranfurly, Village of Innisfree, Hamlet of Minburn, Village of Mannville, Town of Vermilion, Village of Kitscoty, and Hamlet of Blackfoot. The highway is maintained by Alberta Transportation, with the exception of the segment through Elk Island National Park which is maintained by the Government of Canada. Highway 16 passes through the City of Lloydminster along Ray Nelson Drive (44 Street) and is maintained by the City of Lloydminster.  The highway is an arterial street and crosses into Saskatchewan at its intersection with Highway 17 (50 Avenue) where it becomes Saskatchewan Highway 16.

History 

The Yellowhead Highway is named after the Yellowhead Pass in the Rocky Mountains. During the early 1800s, Pierre Bostonais, an Iroquois-Métis trapper with streaks of blonde in his hair, worked for the Hudson's Bay Company.  Because of his hair colour, French-speaking voyageurs referred to him as "Tête Jaune", literally "Yellow Head".  By 1819, Bostonais acted as a guide for the company and had explored a route down the Fraser River to the present city of Prince George. Nearly a century later, the Grand Trunk Pacific (GTP) and Canadian Northern Railway (CNoR) constructed lines that the Yellowhead Highway later paralleled. The two lines between Evansburg, Alberta, and Red Pass Junction were combined into a joint route in 1917, with portions of both lines abandoned. The GTP and CNoR both became part of the new Canadian National Railway (CNR) by 1924.

Following World War I, as automobile use increased exponentially, CNR surveyor Fred Driscoll and Edmonton Automobile and Good Roads Association president formed a committee lobbying for the creation of the Yellowhead Highway. Driscoll believed the abandoned railway bed would be an ideal base for a road. The Edmonton Automobile Association offered a gold medal to the first person to travel from Edmonton to Victoria through the gap. Charles Neiymer and Frank Silverthorne left in 4×4 on June 17, 1922. The following week, George Gordon and J. Sims departed Edmonton in a Ford Model T, following the same route. On July 4, both pairs arrived in Victoria and were each awarded gold medals.

However, it would take until World War II for any improvements to be made this overland route. The displacement of many Japanese-Canadians from the Pacific coast to internment camps in the interior led to some developments.   of road was constructed along the railway bed, and an additional  through steep terrain. By 1944, the Tote Road was opened through Jasper and into the Fraser Valley.

In August 1948, a motorcade was organized as a demonstration of the need for the highway.  The Trans-Canada Highway Act was enacted in 1949, providing a 90% subsidy to upgrade selected routes to modern standards. However, the Tote Highway was not included under this subsidy.  During the same time frame, the Trans Mountain Oil Pipe Line Company began looking at the Tote Road as a potential route for a pipeline between Edmonton and Vancouver. Construction began in 1952, and largely resulted in the destruction of the road along the pipeline's path.

Gradually, work progressed to reconstruct the highway. Elsewhere, the main route of the Trans-Canada Highway was completed in 1957.  The Yellowhead Highway became eligible for federal funding soon thereafter. By 1969, the Tote Road was generally rebuilt and paved. On August 15, 1970, British Columbia Premier W. A. C. Bennett officially opened the Yellowhead Highway.

Future 
Alberta Transportation has conducted long-term studies to twin Highway 16 between Jasper National Park and Highway 40 and freeway upgrades both west and east of Edmonton.  Highway bypass alignments have also been planned for Hinton, Edson, and Lloydminster, all of which have been designated as Highway 16X.

Edmonton has plans to convert Yellowhead Trail to a full freeway by adding interchanges at 127 Street and 121 Street and a partial interchange at 66 Street while a frontage road system will run from 156 Street to at least St. Albert Trail. An interchange at 149 Street was considered, however was scrapped in favor of the frontage road system for cost and land reasons. Edmonton is currently widening the freeway from 50 Street to city limits which are currently 2 lanes in each direction to 3 lanes in each direction, connecting them to the current 3-lane twin bridges over the North Saskatchewan Rivers - the Beverly Bridge and Clover Bar Bridge. Construction is currently underway and is expected to be completed by 2026.

Major intersections 
The following is a list of major intersections along Alberta Highway 16 from west to east, including exit numbers where applied.

Footnotes

References

External links 

Trans-Canada Yellowhead Highway Association
Yellowhead It—Travel Guide to help you plan your next trip along ...

!colspan=3|Yellowhead Highway
|-
|width="30%" style="text-align: center;"|Previous province:British Columbia
|width="30%" style="text-align: center;"|Alberta
|width="30%" style="text-align: center;"|Next province:Saskatchewan

016
016
Alberta 016
Alberta
Edson, Alberta
Lloydminster
Roads in Edmonton
Roads in Strathcona County
Spruce Grove